Hurt is the fourth extended play by American emo band Hawthorne Heights, released on September 18, 2015. It is the third and final EP in the Hate/Hope/Hurt trilogy.

Track listing

Personnel
Hawthorne Heights
 JT Woodruff – lead vocals, rhythm guitar
 Mark McMillion – lead guitar, unclean vocals, backing vocals
 Matt Ridenour – bass, backing vocals

Additional musicians
 Christopher Lee "Poppy" Popadak – drums, backing vocals

References

2015 EPs
Hawthorne Heights albums
Self-released EPs